In mathematics, separation of variables (also known as the Fourier method) is any of several methods for solving ordinary and partial differential equations, in which algebra allows one to rewrite an equation so that each of two variables occurs on a different side of the equation.

Ordinary differential equations (ODE) 

Suppose a differential equation can be written in the form

which we can write more simply by letting :

As long as h(y) ≠ 0, we can rearrange terms to obtain:

so that the two variables x and y have been separated. dx (and dy) can be viewed, at a simple level, as just a convenient notation, which provides a handy mnemonic aid for assisting with manipulations. A formal definition of dx as a differential (infinitesimal) is somewhat advanced.

Alternative notation 

Those who dislike Leibniz's notation may prefer to write this as

but that fails to make it quite as obvious why this is called "separation of variables".

or equivalently,

because of the substitution rule for integrals.

If one can evaluate the two integrals, one can find a solution to the differential equation.  Observe that this process effectively allows us to treat the derivative  as a fraction which can be separated.  This allows us to solve separable differential equations more conveniently, as demonstrated in the example below.

(Note that we do not need to use two constants of integration, in equation as in

because a single constant  is equivalent.)

Example 
Population growth is often modeled by the differential equation

 

Separation of variables may be used to solve this differential equation.

 

To evaluate the integral on the left side, we simplify the fraction

 

and then, we decompose the fraction into partial fractions

 

Thus we have

 
Let .

Therefore, the solution to the logistic equation is

 

Then we have

 

Noting that , and solving for A we get

Generalization of separable ODEs to the nth order 
Much like one can speak of a separable first-order ODE, one can speak of a separable second-order, third-order or nth-order ODE. Consider the separable first-order ODE:

The derivative can alternatively be written the following way to underscore that it is an operator working on the unknown function, y:

Thus, when one separates variables for first-order equations, one in fact moves the dx denominator of the operator to the side with the x variable, and the d(y) is left on the side with the y variable. The second-derivative operator, by analogy, breaks down as follows:

The third-, fourth- and nth-derivative operators break down in the same way. Thus, much like a first-order separable ODE is reducible to the form

a separable second-order ODE is reducible to the form

and an nth-order separable ODE is reducible to

Example 
Consider the simple nonlinear second-order differential equation:This equation is an equation only of y'' and y', meaning it is reducible to the general form described above and is, therefore, separable. Since it is a second-order separable equation, collect all x variables on one side and all y' variables on the other to get:Now, integrate the right side with respect to x and the left with respect to y''':This giveswhich simplifies to:This is now a simple integral problem that gives the final answer:

 Partial differential equations 

The method of separation of variables is also used to solve a wide range of linear partial differential equations with boundary and initial conditions, such as the heat equation, wave equation, Laplace equation, Helmholtz equation and biharmonic equation.

The analytical method of separation of variables for solving partial differential equations has also been generalized into a computational method of decomposition in invariant structures that can be used to solve systems of partial differential equations.

 Example: homogeneous case 

Consider the one-dimensional heat equation. The equation is

The variable u denotes temperature. The boundary condition is homogeneous, that is

Let us attempt to find a solution which is not identically zero satisfying the boundary conditions but with the following property: u is a product in which the dependence of u on x, t is separated, that is:

Substituting u back into equation  and using the product rule,

Since the right hand side depends only on x and the left hand side only on t, both sides are equal to some constant value −λ. Thus:

and

−λ here is the eigenvalue for both differential operators, and T(t) and X(x) are corresponding eigenfunctions.

We will now show that solutions for X(x) for values of λ ≤ 0 cannot occur:

Suppose that λ < 0. Then there exist real numbers B, C such that

From  we get

and therefore B = 0 = C which implies u is identically 0.

Suppose that λ = 0. Then there exist real numbers B, C such that

From  we conclude in the same manner as in 1 that u is identically 0.

Therefore, it must be the case that λ > 0. Then there exist real numbers A, B, C such that

and

From  we get C = 0 and that for some positive integer n,

Hence a complete solution can be given as

where Dn are coefficients determined by initial condition.

Given the initial condition

we can get

This is the sine series expansion of f(x).

This method requires that the eigenfunctions X, here , are orthogonal and complete. In general this is guaranteed by Sturm–Liouville theory.

 Example: nonhomogeneous case 

Suppose the equation is nonhomogeneous,

Expand h(x,t), u(x,t) and f(x) into

where hn(t) and bn can be calculated by integration, while un(t) is to be determined.

 

which are a sequence of linear differential equations that can be readily solved with, for instance, Laplace transform, or Integrating factor. Finally, we can get
 

One has to find a function v that satisfies the boundary condition only, and subtract it from u. The function u-v then satisfies homogeneous boundary condition, and can be solved with the above method.

 Example: mixed derivatives 

For some equations involving mixed derivatives, the equation does not separate as easily as the heat equation did in the first example above, but nonetheless separation of variables may still be applied. Consider the two-dimensional biharmonic equation

Proceeding in the usual manner, we look for solutions of the form

and we obtain the equation

Writing this equation in the form

Returning to the equation for X and Y, we have two cases

and

 Curvilinear coordinates 

In orthogonal curvilinear coordinates, separation of variables can still be used, but in some details different from that in Cartesian coordinates. For instance, regularity or periodic condition may determine the eigenvalues in place of boundary conditions. See spherical harmonics for example.

 Applicability 
Partial differential equations

For many PDEs, such as the wave equation, Helmholtz equation and Schrodinger equation, the applicability of separation of variables is a result of the spectral theorem. In some cases, separation of variables may not be possible. Separation of variables may be possible in some coordinate systems but not others, and which coordinate systems allow for separation depends on the symmetry properties of the equation. Below is an outline of an argument demonstrating the applicability of the method to certain linear equations, although the precise method may differ in individual cases (for instance in the biharmonic equation above).

 for  
 for 

where  is a known function.

We look for solutions of the form . Dividing the PDE through by  gives

Let the spectrum of  be  and let  be an eigenfunction with eigenvalue . In particular, we know the solution  can be written as

For some functions . In the separation of variables, these functions are given by solutions to 

Hence, the spectral theorem ensures that the separation of variables will (when it is possible) find all the solutions.

While these operators may not be compact, their inverses (when they exist) may be, as in the case of the wave equation, and these inverses have the same eigenfunctions and eigenvalues as the original operator (with the possible exception of zero).

 Matrices 
The matrix form of the separation of variables is the Kronecker sum.

As an example we consider the 2D discrete Laplacian on a regular grid:

See the main article Kronecker sum of discrete Laplacians for details.

Software 
Some mathematical programs are able to do separation of variables: Xcas among others.

See also
Inseparable differential equation

Notes

References

External links 
 
 
 Methods of Generalized and Functional Separation of Variables at EqWorld: The World of Mathematical Equations
 Examples of separating variables to solve PDEs
 "A Short Justification of Separation of Variables"

Ordinary differential equations
Partial differential equations